Fraser is a suburb in the Belconnen district of Canberra, located within the Australian Capital Territory, Australia. Fraser lies at the north west end of Belconnen.

The suburb is named after James Reay Fraser, who was Member of the Australian House of Representatives for the Division of Australian Capital Territory from 1951 to 1970 and Vice Chairman of the Joint Committee of the Australian Capital Territory from 1959 to 1970. It was gazetted on 15 January 1974. Streets are named after early residents of Canberra.

Fraser has a neighbourhood oval and primary school. It is bordered to the north by Kuringa Drive.

Political representation 

For the purposes of Australian federal elections for the House of Representatives, Fraser is in the Division of Fenner.

For the purposes of Australian Capital Territory elections for the ACT Legislative Assembly, Fraser is in the Ginninderra electorate.

Geology

Silurian age Hawkins Volcanics green-grey dacite and quartz andesite fill the underground parts of the suburb.

Educational institutions

Fraser Primary School is a local government primary school.  It offers education for students from preschool to year 6.

References

Suburbs of Canberra